Sri Dev Suman born as Sri Dutt Badoni (25 May 1916 – 25 July 1944) was a social activist and freedom fighter from princely state  Tehri Garhwal of British India India. Currently District Tehri of Uttarakhand India.

Early life 
Suman hailed from Tehri District of the Indian state of Uttarakhand. He was born at Jaul village patti Bamund near the chamba city of Tehri Garhwal.

Independence movement 
During the Indian independence movement, Suman advocated that Tehri Riyasat be free from the rule of  King of Garhwal. He was an admirer of Gandhi and practiced nonviolence to struggle for the freedom of Tehri.

During his fight with the King of Tehri, Bolanda Badri, (speaking Badrinath), he demanded complete independence for Tehri.

On 30 December 1943, he was declared a rebel and arrested by Tehri kingdom. In jail, Suman was tortured, heavily shackled, ate food hand is jailer Mohan Singh and others mixed with sand or stone. He started a hunger strike. Jail staff tried to force him to eat, without success. After 209 days in prison and on hunger strike for 84 days, Sri Dev Suman died on 25 July 1944

His corpse was thrown into the Bhilangna River without a funeral.

References

Sri Dev Suman Biography

1916 births
1944 deaths
Indian independence activists from Uttarakhand
People from Tehri Garhwal district